CRRC Ziyang Co., Ltd. is a Chinese locomotive manufacturer, one of the subsidiaries of CRRC. The plant was located in Ziyang, Sichuan Province.

History
CRRC Ziyang Co., Ltd. (hereinafter referred to as The company) is a subsidiary of CRRC Corporation Limited, and which it is an important rail transit equipment enterprise in China. Over the years, the company committed to build a core enterprise of characteristic and advanced rail transit equipment.

The company was established in 1966. Over the past 50 years, the company has produced more than 7000 units of various types of diesel and electric locomotives, which have been radiated to the national railways, local (joint venture) railways, metallurgy, petrochemical, mining and other industries. It has been exported more than 1000 units diesel locomotives to more 30 countries in Asia, Africa, America, and Australia. And more than 95% of the products exported to countries along the “Belt and Road” such as Kazakhstan, Turkmenistan, and Pakistan.

The company's main business includes: locomotive business (manufacture and modernization of electric locomotives/diesel locomotives, locomotive maintenance services and manufacture of hybrid locomotive etc.); New-mode rail transit business (hanging monorail train, mountain rack locomotive and other special vehicles); engine business (locomotive engines, marine engines, gas engines, diesel and gas generator sets, power station EPC project etc.); superior spare parts business (medium-speed engine all-fiber forged steel crankshafts, large forged castings, etc.); and new industry business etc.

The company has a national-level technology center, and has passed the "China National Laboratory" accreditation, which it is a national first-level measurement organization; the company has passed the ISO9001 Quality Management System version 2015, ISO14001:2015 Environmental Management System and ISO45001:2018 Occupational Health and Safety Management system certification.

 In 1966, factory was addressed in Ziyang.
 In 1973, successful trial production of the first shunting diesel locomotive.
 In 1983, successful trial production of the first mainline diesel locomotive.
 In 1992, it is the first time that commercialized diesel locomotive - CK5 has been exported to overseas.
 In 2001, the first batch of 10 mainline locomotives were exported to Vietnam - the first entry into foreign mainline diesel locomotives market.
 In 2006, it is the first time that Chinese locomotive manufacturing technology has been exported to overseas.
 In 2009, the first unit of HXD large-power AC electric locomotive off the assembly line.
 In 2011, it is the first time that AC-transmission diesel locomotive has been exported to developed country.
 In 2012, the first power plant EPC project of CRRC was completed.
 In 2014, The first seven-hundred exported diesel locomotive off the assembly line.
 In 2015, the hybrid locomotive with world’s largest power off the assembly line.
 In 2015, CNR and CSR reorganized and merged to form CRRC - the company changed its name to "CRRC Ziyang Co., Ltd."
 In 2016, the first commercialized new energy hanging rail (Panda Air Rail) in China rolls off the assembly line.
 In 2017, the first meter gauge diesel locomotive CDD6A1 exported to South America.
 In 2018, the first overseas Substation was successfully handed over to the owner - the Bangladesh Substation project was put into commercial operation.
 In 2019, the company's new energy locomotive 28T Battery locomotive off the assembly line.
 In August 2020, the company's self-developed hybrid locomotive with the world's largest power is the first hybrid locomotive in China to get the "Type Certificate" and "Manufacturing License" which issued by the State Railway Administration.
 In 2021, the company pioneers to complete the hybrid modernization of old diesel locomotives in China.

Products
CRRC Ziyang's major products are crankshafts, locomotives, gas and diesel engines, mechanical parts for engines and castings and forgings.

Diesel-Hydraulic Locomotive Platform
 CK6 Diesel Locomotive
 CK5C Diesel Locomotive 
 GK1C Diesel Locomotive

AC-DC Diesel Locomotive Platform
 SDD10 Diesel Locomotive 
 CKD6E Diesel Locomotive 
 SDD1A Diesel Locomotive 
 SDD1 Diesel Locomotive 
 CKD7F (D19E) Diesel Locomotive 
 SDD2 Diesel Locomotive 
 SDD22 (ZCU20) Diesel Locomotive 
 SDD23(ZCU30) Diesel Locomotive 
 CDD6A1 Diesel Locomotive 
 CKD9C Diesel Locomotive 
 CKD9A Diesel Locomotive 
 DF8B Diesel Locomotive

AC Diesel Locomotive Platform
 SDA4 (TPIPL, ITD) Diesel Locomotive 
 SDA1 (CSR Class, QBX, BK) Diesel Locomotive

DMU
 HD100A DMU
 HD100B DMU

New Energy Locomotive
 HXN6 Hybrid Locomotive

References

External links
 official website

 
Ziyang
Companies based in Sichuan
Ministry of Railways of China